David Mulugheta (born 1982) is an American football agent at Athletes First in Laguna Hills, California. He currently represents 42 NFL players, including Jalen Ramsey, Deshaun Watson, Budda Baker, Michael Thomas, AJ Terrell, and Kyle Pitts.

Early life and education 
Mulugheta was born in Dallas, Texas. His parents are Eritrean immigrants. His father worked two jobs, one as a taxi driver and another at a gas station. He attended the University of Texas at Austin as well as the University of Nebraska College of Law.

Career 
Mulugheta began his career as an intern at Athletes First in 2010, after meeting agent Andrew Kessler. Mulugheta became an NFLPA certified contract advisor in 2012 and became an agent at Athletes First. Since then, Mulugheta has gone on to represent many Pro Bowl and All-Pro players.

Accolades 
Mulugheta was recognized in 2020 by Forbes as the top NFL agent (in terms of negotiated deals and commissions) in the world, holding a rank of eighth across agents of any sport. He is also Forbes' highest ranked black sports agent.

References

External links 
 Official website

Sports agents
1983 births
Living people